In abstract algebra, a skew lattice is an algebraic structure that is a non-commutative generalization of a lattice. While the term skew lattice can be used to refer to any non-commutative generalization of a lattice, since 1989 it has been used primarily as follows.

Definition

,

.

 if ,

 if .

Historical background
For over 60 years, noncommutative variations of lattices have been studied with differing motivations. For some the motivation has been an interest in the conceptual boundaries of lattice theory; for others it was a search for noncommutative forms of logic and Boolean algebra; and for others it has been the behavior of idempotents in rings. The precise identities chosen depends upon the underlying motivation, with differing choices producing distinct varieties of algebras.

Pascual Jordan, motivated by questions in quantum logic, initiated a study of noncommutative lattices in his 1949 paper, Über Nichtkommutative Verbände, choosing the absorption identities

He referred to those algebras satisfying them as Schrägverbände.  By varying or augmenting these identities, Jordan and others obtained a number of varieties of noncommutative lattices.
Beginning with Jonathan Leech's 1989 paper, Skew lattices in rings, skew lattices as defined above have been the primary objects of study.  This was aided by previous results about bands. This was especially the case for many of the basic properties.

Basic properties
Natural partial order and natural quasiorder

In a skew lattice , the natural partial order is defined by  if , or dually, . While  and  agree on lattices,  properly refines  in the noncommutative case. The induced natural equivalence  is defined by  if , that is, 
The blocks of the partition  are
lattice ordered by  if  and  exist such that . This permits us to draw Hasse diagrams of skew lattices such as the following pair:

segment. The slanted lines reveal the natural partial order between elements of the distinct -classes. The elements ,  and  form the singleton -classes.

Rectangular Skew Lattices

Skew lattices consisting of a single -class are called rectangular. Rectangular skew lattices are isomorphic to skew lattices having the following construction (and conversely): given nonempty
This is the Clifford–McLean theorem for skew lattices, first given for bands separately by Clifford and McLean. It is also known as the first decomposition theorem for skew lattices.

Right (left) handed skew lattices and the Kimura factorization

A skew lattice is right-handed if it satisfies the identity  or dually, .
Many examples of skew lattices are either right- or left-handed. This is the Kimura factorization of  into a fibred product of its maximal right- and left-handed images.

Like the Clifford–McLean theorem, Kimura factorization (or the second decomposition theorem for skew lattices) was first given for regular bands (bands that satisfy the middle absorption
identity). The above symbols ,  and  come, of course, from basic semigroup theory.

Subvarieties of skew lattices
Skew lattices form a variety. Rectangular skew lattices, left-handed and right-handed skew lattices all form subvarieties that are central to the basic structure theory of skew lattices. Here are several
more.

Symmetric skew lattices

A skew lattice S is symmetric if for any  ,  if . Occurrences of commutation are thus unambiguous for such skew lattices, with subsets of pairwise commuting elements generating commutative subalgebras, i.e., sublattices. (This is not true for skew lattices in general.) Equational bases for this subvariety, first given by Spinks are:
All symmetric skew lattices for which  admit a lattice section. This leads to a commuting diagram of embedding dualizing the preceding Kimura diagram.

Cancellative skew lattices

A skew lattice is cancellative if  and  implies  and likewise  and  implies . Cancellatice skew lattices are symmetric and can be shown to form a variety. Unlike lattices, they need not be distributive, and conversely.

Distributive skew lattices

Distributive skew lattices are determined by the identities:

  (D1)

 (D'1)

Unlike lattices, (D1) and (D'1) are not equivalent in general for skew lattices, but they are for symmetric skew lattices. The condition (D1) can be strengthened to 

 (D2) 

in which case (D'1) is a consequence. A skew lattice  satisfies both (D2) and its dual, if and only if it factors as the product of a distributive lattice and a rectangular skew lattice. In this latter case (D2) can be strengthened to 

(D3)

On its own, (D3) is equivalent to (D2) when symmetry is added. We thus have six subvarieties of skew lattices determined respectively by (D1), (D2), (D3) and their duals.

Normal skew lattices

As seen above,  and  satisfy the identity . Bands satisfying the stronger identity, are called normal. A skew lattice is normal skew if it satisfies

(Thus normal skew lattices have also been called local lattices.) Thus both normal skew lattices and split skew lattices form varieties. Returning to distribution,  so that  characterizes the variety of distributive, normal skew lattices, and (D3) characterizes the variety of symmetric, distributive, normal skew lattices.

Categorical skew lattices

A skew lattice is categorical if nonempty composites of coset bijections are coset bijections. Categorical skew lattices form a variety. Skew lattices in rings and normal skew lattices are examples
of algebras in this variety. A skew lattice  is categorical if one always has the equality , i.e. , if the
All distributive skew lattices are categorical. Though symmetric skew lattices might not be. In a sense they reveal the independence between the properties of symmetry and distributivity.

Skew Boolean algebras
A zero element in a skew lattice S is an element 0 of S such that for all   or, dually,  (0)

A Boolean skew lattice is a symmetric, distributive normal skew lattice with 0,  such that  is a Boolean lattice for each  Given such skew lattice S, a difference operator \ is defined by x \ y =  where the latter is evaluated in the Boolean lattice  In the presence of (D3) and (0), \ is characterized by the identities:

One thus has a variety of skew Boolean algebras  characterized by identities (D3), (0) and (S B). A primitive skew Boolean algebra consists of 0 and a single non-0 D-class.
and  otherwise. Every skew Boolean algebra is a subdirect product of primitive algebras. Skew Boolean algebras play an important role in the study of discriminator varieties and other generalizations in universal algebra of Boolean behavior.

Skew lattices in rings

Clearly  but also  is associative. In fact, every multiplicative band in  that is maximal with respect to being right regular (= ) is also closed under  and so forms a right-handed skew lattice. Maximal regular bands need not to be closed under  as defined; counterexamples are easily found using multiplicative rectangular bands. When  itself is closed under multiplication, then it is a normal band and thus forms a Boolean skew lattice. In fact, any skew Boolean algebra can be embedded into such an algebra. When A has a multiplicative identity , the condition that  is multiplicatively closed is well known to imply that  forms a Boolean algebra. Skew lattices in rings continue to be a good source of examples and motivation.

Primitive skew lattices
Skew lattices consisting of exactly two D-classes are called primitive skew lattices.

{}    and    {} 

Cosets are always rectangular subalgebras in their -classes. What is more, the partial order  induces a coset bijection  defined by:

Then:

Thus each coset bijection is, in some sense, a maximal collection of mutually parallel pairs .

Every primitive skew lattice  factors as the fibred product of its maximal left and right- handed primitive images . Right-handed primitive skew lattices are constructed as follows. For each pair  pick a fixed bijection  from  onto .

 and 

The various  are the coset bijections.

One constructs left-handed primitive skew lattices in dual fashion.  All right [left] handed primitive skew lattices can be constructed in this fashion.

The coset structure of skew lattices
a slightly less direct manner than the -comparable case.

Thus a skew lattice may be viewed as a coset atlas of rectangular skew lattices placed on the vertices of a lattice and coset bijections between them, the latter seen as partial isomorphisms
between the rectangular algebras with each coset bijection determining a corresponding pair of cosets.  This perspective gives, in essence, the Hasse diagram of the skew lattice, which is easily
drawn in cases of relatively small order. (See the diagrams in Section 3 above.) If it is not, then a unique coset bijection  exists such that . This inclusion can be strict. It is always an equality (given ) on a given skew lattice S precisely when S is categorical. In this case, by including the identity maps on each rectangular D-class and adjoining empty bijections between properly comparable D-classes, one has a category of rectangular algebras and coset bijections between them. The simple examples in Section 3 are categorical.

See also
Semigroup theory
Lattice theory

References

Lattice theory
Semigroup theory